Thomas Young (February 19, 1731 – June 24, 1777) was doctor, philosopher and a member of the Boston Committee of Correspondence and an organizer of the Boston Tea Party. Young was a mentor and teacher to Ethan Allen.

Early life and activities

Thomas Young was born February 19, 1731, in Little Britain in New Windsor, New York. He was the son of first cousins John and Mary Crawford Young. John Young emigrated from Ireland to America in 1729 with a group led by Charles Clinton of County Longford. 

Charles Clinton, John Young, and Mary Crawford Young were all second cousins through their grandparents, siblings James Clinton (1667-1718) and Margaret Clinton Parks (1650-1710). The Clintons, Youngs, and Crawfords shared a distant grandmother, Elizabeth Blount mistress of King Henry the VIII and mother of the king's son Henry FitzRoy. As Covenanters, the Clinton family had escaped from Scotland to Ireland in the seventeenth century (New York Genealogical and Biographical Record 1882, Vol. 12: p. 193). 

Although Charles Clinton and John Young had emigrated from Ireland with the intention of settling in Pennsylvania, near a group of fellow-Covenanters, their chartered ship, the George and Anne, was taken off-course by an unscrupulous captain who held Clinton and Young captive until they paid a ransom. During their captivity, most of their fellow passengers perished of small-pox, starvation, or ship fever. Finding themselves in Boston after this ordeal, within a year Young and Clinton made their way to Little Britain. It is unclear when Mary Crawford joined them in Little Britain or whether she was among the passengers of the George and Anne, although it seems likely that she emigrated with her cousins (New York Genealogical and Biographical Record 1882, Vol. 13, p. 882). 

A biographical sketch of Charles Clinton describes Little Britain thus: "after investigation, [Charles Clinton] settled at a place designated (for town purposes until 1763) as 'the precinct of the highlands.' It is embraced in modern Orange County, but until after the Revolutionary War it was in Ulster County. His neighborhood was called Little Britain. James Kennedy, a New York merchant . . . James Alexander, a New York lawyer and member of the Governor's council, and his co-partner, William Smith, had before secured grants of land in the precinct of the highlands. It was border-land toward the Indians, west of the Hudson, not yet settled by white men. It was without habitations, except Indian huts, and without roads, except Indian trails. So late as about 1845, more than one hundred years after this settlement, a living occupant could describe the appearance of one hundred wigwams on the side hills within sight of her father's house (Eager, p. 619)" (ibid.). Thomas Young's parents settled in farmland adjoining the Clintons, and here Thomas Young was born soon after the group's arrival in Little Britain.

After demonstrating much intellectual brilliance as a child, Thomas Young was apprenticed to a local physician and then began his own medical practice in Amenia in Dutchess County in 1753.

In 1755, he married Mary Winegar of Litchfield, Connecticut. They had two sons and four daughters. In August 1758 Young was indicted in the Crum Elbow Precinct of Dutchess County, New York, for speaking and publishing "blasphemous words" concerning the Christian religion.

Young met the young Ethan Allen while Allen was living in Salisbury, Connecticut, and Young was practicing medicine just across the provincial boundary in Amenia, New York. Only five years older than Allen, Young taught the younger Allen a great deal about philosophy and political theory. Young and Allen eventually decided to collaborate on a book intended to be an attack on organized religion, as Young had convinced Allen to become a Deist. They worked on the manuscript until 1764, when Young moved away from the area, taking the manuscript with him.

They also shared an interest in ingrafting, an early form of inoculation, particularly in relation to smallpox. Ingrafting was considered a heresy by New England clergy and punishable by law, if not conducted with the consent of the town selectman. In 1764, Allen insisted that Young inject him with the virus on the Salisbury meeting house steps to prove whether or not ingrafting worked. They did this on a Sunday. Allen did not suffer from the virus, but when news of what they had done spread Allen was hauled into court for a blasphemous response to the investigating official.

In October 1764, Young moved to Albany to establish a medical practice. While there his son Rasman was baptized at the Lutheran Church. Young invested in a real estate venture with [John Henry Lydius, which subsequently failed. Young became involved in the resistance movement in Albany in the 1760s and helped found the Sons of Liberty there.

Boston
Young arrived in Boston in 1765 and became a family physician to John Adams. He was active in the city’s Committee of Correspondence and became a committeeman for the Sons of Liberty.

In 1773 Philadelphia physician Benjamin Rush and member of the Sons of Liberty authored a diatribe inveighing against British Tea and its harmful properties, both physical and political. It was quickly reprinted in Boston, where Young had already spoke out in a similar vein in a letter to the Boston Evening Post of October 25. Young is considered to be one of the active organizers of the Boston Tea Party although he himself did not actually participate in the destruction of the tea chests. At the time he was addressing a crowd at the Old South Meeting House on the negative health effects of tea drinking. According to the Boston Tea Party Museum, this was probably a diversion intended to help the Tea Party organizers by keeping the crowd in the Meeting House while the tea was being destroyed.

Philadelphia
In 1774 Young, having received death threats (although for his political or religious views is unclear) left Boston for Newport. In 1775, he moved to Philadelphia and helped frame the state constitution, the most democratic constitution among the original states.

Young also suggested the name of Vermont for the new state north of Massachusetts, which was originally called New Connecticut.  The reasoning in his letter to the Vermont Constitutional Convention in 1777 was that most of Vermont was in the Green Mountains, said to have been named by Samuel de Champlain. Young chose to combine "vert" (green) with "mont" (mountain) to honor the Green Mountain Boys.  Young named several communities in New York state, including Amenia.

Young died in Philadelphia on June 24, 1777, aged 46.

Deism
In 1772 Young published a deist statement of beliefs in a Boston newspaper.

Works
 A Poem to the Memory of James Wolfe ... Who was slain upon the Plains of Abraham, (1761)
 Reflections on the Disputes Between New York, New Hampshire and Col. John Henry Lydius in which he railed against land speculators and the New York aristocracy. (1764) 
 Reason: the Only Oracle of Man - with Ethan Allen (published posthumously by Allen 1785)

References

Further reading
 Kolenda, Benjamin, "Re-Discovering Ethan Allen and Thomas Young's Reason the Only Oracle of Man: The Rise of Deism in Pre-Revolutionary America" (thesis), Georgia State University, 2013

External links
 Letter from Thomas Young to Hugh Hughes, 21 December, 1772", The Massachusetts Historical Society
 "A Short History of the Boston Tea Party", Old South Meeting House 
 Reason and Revolution: The Radicalism of Dr. Thomas Young, P. Maier, American Quarterly, 1976.
 The Original Tea Partier Was an Atheist, Matthew Stewart, Politico, 1 September 2014.
 No, the Original Tea Partier Was Not an ‘Atheist’, Charles C.W. Cooke, National Review Online, 3 September 2014.

1731 births
1777 deaths
American tax resisters
American deists
People of Massachusetts in the American Revolution
People from colonial Boston
Physicians in the American Revolution
People of colonial Massachusetts
People from New Windsor, New York
People of the Province of New York